Acácio de Almeida (born 29 June 1938) is a Portuguese cinematographer best known for his work with João César Monteiro, Raúl Ruiz, Alain Tanner, Valeria Sarmiento and Rita Azevedo Gomes.

Filmography 

 Past and Present (1972)
 Brandos Costumes (1974)
 Trás-os-Montes (1976)
 Veredas (1978)
 Silvestre (1981)
 A Ilha dos Amores (1982)
 Ana (1982)
 City of Pirates (1983)
 In the White City (1983)
 Manoel's Destinies (1984)
 Régime sans pain (1985)
 Treasure Island (1985)
 Mammame (1986)
 A Portuguese Goodbye (1986)
 A Flame in My Heart (1987)
 The Mask (1988)
 O Sangue (1989)
 Etoile (1989)
 Un Asunto Privado (1996)
 The Mutants (1998)
 Love Torn in a Dream (2000)
 Rasganço (2001)
 Aparelho Voador a Baixa Altitude (2002)
 That Day (2003)
 Second Life (2009)
 Paixão (2012)
 Se Eu Fosse Ladrão, Roubava (2013)
 Colo (2017)
 The Black Book of Father Dinis (2018)

References

External links

1938 births
Living people
Portuguese cinematographers